Ole Ingvaldsen (born  in Stavanger) is a Norwegian curler and curling coach.

As a coach of Norwegian national teams he participated in 2002, 2006, 2010 Winter Olympics, in 2014 Winter Paralympics and big lot of World and European championships.

He is a member of Board of Directors in Norwegian Curling Association.

Teams

Record as a coach of national teams

References

External links

Living people
1948 births
Sportspeople from Stavanger
Norwegian male curlers
Norwegian curling coaches